Nélio da Silva Melo (born 26 January 1971) better known as Nélio is a Brazilian footballer who played as a midfielder.

Career
Nélio scored three times for Haladás during the 2000–01 Hungarian National Championship I. He then returned to Brazil to play for Botafogo (SP) in August 2001.

He signed for Botafogo (PB) in December 2001. He played in the 2002 Copa do Brasil and the 2002 Campeonato do Nordeste, scoring in the latter competition. He recovered from an injury in April.

Nélio played twice for Haladás during the 2003–04 Hungarian National Championship I.

Personal life
Nélio's brothers Nildeson and Gilberto were also footballers, and represented El Salvador and Brazil respectively.

Honours 
 Flamengo
 Copa São Paulo de Futebol Júnior: 1990
 Copa do Brasil: 1990
 Copa Rio: 1991
 Campeonato Carioca: 1991, 1996
 Campeonato Brasileiro Série A: 1992

 Atlético Mineiro
 Campeonato Mineiro: 1999

 Atlético Paranaense
 Campeonato Paranaense: 1998
 Copa Paraná: 1998

References

External links

futpedia.globo.com

1971 births
Living people
Footballers from Rio de Janeiro (city)
Association football midfielders
Expatriate footballers in Hungary
Brazilian footballers
Brazilian expatriate footballers
Campeonato Brasileiro Série A players
Campeonato Brasileiro Série B players
CR Flamengo footballers
Guarani FC players
Fluminense FC players
Club Athletico Paranaense players
Ituano FC players
Paraná Clube players
Americano Futebol Clube players
Botafogo Futebol Clube (SP) players
Botafogo Futebol Clube (PB) players
Esporte Clube Flamengo players
Ypiranga Clube players